Eudesmia tehuacana is a moth of the subfamily Arctiinae. It is found in Mexico.

References

 Natural History Museum Lepidoptera generic names catalog

Eudesmia
Moths described in 1917